Kate Lynch (born June 29, 1959) is a Canadian film, television and stage actress, drama teacher, theatre director and playwright.

Biography
In 1980 she won the Genie Award for Best Actress for Meatballs. She was notably adept at improvisation against the formidable Bill Murray; director Ivan Reitman commented,

In her acceptance speech, however, she communicated the belief that she had won the award more for the fact of being a Canadian actress in a popular hit film, at a time when Canadian films still predominantly cast bigger-name stars from the United States, than for her actual performance. She was nominated for the same award in 1988 for her role in Taking Care; although she did not win on that occasion, she told the press that being nominated for that film meant more to her than winning for Meatballs, as by this time the quality of Canadian film had significantly improved and the controversial division of the Genie acting categories into separate awards for Canadian and foreign actors had been discontinued.

Her other film credits include Lie with Me, Soup for One, Def-Con 4, God Bless the Child and The Guardian, while her television credits include Custard Pie, Anne of Avonlea and guest roles in Adderly, Danger Bay, Seeing Things, Queer as Folk, This Is Wonderland, Lost Girl and Degrassi.

As a playwright, her plays include Newcomer, Ten Minute Play: The Musical, The Road to Hell (cowritten with Michael Healey), Tales of the Blonde Assassin and Early August.

As a director, she has directed plays for the Shaw Festival, the Blyth Festival and Theatre Passe Muraille, including productions of William Shakespeare's Henry V, A Midsummer Night's Dream, Pericles and Cymbeline, Samuel Beckett's Waiting for Godot, Terence Rattigan's French Without Tears, Noël Coward's Star Chamber, Eve Ensler's The Vagina Monologues and Michael Healey's The Nuttalls. She has taught for University College Drama Program, the Stratford Festival, the Shaw Festival, George Brown College and Ryerson University (now Toronto Metropolitan University).

Filmography

Film

Television

Theatre

References

External links

Canadian film actresses
Canadian television actresses
Canadian stage actresses
Canadian women dramatists and playwrights
Canadian theatre directors
Best Actress Genie and Canadian Screen Award winners
Living people
1959 births
20th-century Canadian dramatists and playwrights
21st-century Canadian dramatists and playwrights
20th-century Canadian women writers
21st-century Canadian women writers